Mud Lick Creek is a  long 3rd order tributary to the Rocky River in Chatham County, North Carolina.

Course
Mud Lick Creek rises about 2 miles northeast of Crutchfield Crossroads, North Carolina in Chatham County.  Mud Lick Creek then flows southwest to join the Rocky River about 2 miles southwest of Crutchfield Crossroads.

Watershed
Mud Lick Creek drains  of area, receives about 47.7 in/year of precipitation, has a wetness index of 440.67 and is about 41% forested.

References

Rivers of North Carolina
Rivers of Chatham County, North Carolina